Rushford railway station served the area of Longsight, historically in Lancashire, England, from 1840 to 1843 on the Manchester and Birmingham Railway.

History
The station was opened on 4 June 1840 by the Manchester and Birmingham Railway. It was a very short-lived railway station, only being open for under 3 years before closing on 10 April 1843.

References

Disused railway stations in Greater Manchester
Railway stations in Great Britain opened in 1840
Railway stations in Great Britain closed in 1843
1840 establishments in England
1843 disestablishments in England